Shelburn is a town in Curry Township, Sullivan County, in the U.S. state of Indiana. The population was 1,252 at the 2010 census. It is part of the Terre Haute Metropolitan Statistical Area.

History
Shelburn was named after the town's founder, Paschal Shelburn. The Shelburn post office has been in operation since 1861. An F4 tornado devastated the northwestern part of Shelburn on May 21, 1949, killing 14 people and destroying 160 homes.

Geography
Shelburn is located at  (39.179506, -87.396900).

Demographics

2010 census
As of the census of 2010, there were 1,252 people, 485 households, and 334 families living in the town. The racial makeup of the town was 96.2% White, 0.5% Native American, 0.6% Asian, 0.6% from other races, and 2.2% from two or more races. Hispanic or Latino of any race were 1.2% of the population.

There were 485 households, of which 36.3% had children under the age of 18 living with them, 44.1% were married couples living together, 16.5% had a female householder with no husband present, 8.2% had a male householder with no wife present, and 31.1% were non-families. 23.7% of all households were made up of individuals, and 8.6% had someone living alone who was 65 years of age or older. The average household size was 2.58 and the average family size was 3.00.

The median age in the town was 37.1 years. 26.8% of residents were under the age of 18; 8.3% were between the ages of 18 and 24; 26% were from 25 to 44; 26.5% were from 45 to 64; and 12.5% were 65 years of age or older. The gender makeup of the town was 48.5% male and 51.5% female.

2000 census
As of the census of 2000, there were 1,268 people, 510 households, and 350 families living in the town. The racial makeup of the town was 97.79% White, 0.24% African American, 0.08% Native American, 0.16% Asian, 0.39% from other races, and 1.34% from two or more races. Hispanic or Latino of any race were 0.55% of the population.

There were 510 households, out of which 33.3% had children under the age of 18 living with them, 48.0% were married couples living together, 14.7% had a female householder with no husband present, and 31.2% were non-families. 27.8% of all households were made up of individuals, and 11.4% had someone living alone who was 65 years of age or older. The average household size was 2.47 and the average family size was 2.96.

In the town, the population was spread out, with 27.6% under the age of 18, 9.1% from 18 to 24, 26.7% from 25 to 44, 23.9% from 45 to 64, and 12.8% who were 65 years of age or older. The median age was 34 years. For every 100 females, there were 94.2 males. For every 100 females age 18 and over, there were 91.3 males.

The median income for a household in the town was $25,714, and the median income for a family was $30,294. Males had a median income of $26,467 versus $20,521 for females. The per capita income for the town was $12,752. About 17.0% of families and 18.0% of the population were below the poverty line, including 24.5% of those under age 18 and 12.7% of those age 65 or over.

Education
Shelburn has a public library, a branch of the Sullivan County Public Library.

Interurban Depot
Shelburn is home to the Shelburn THI&E (Terre Haute, Indianapolis and Eastern Traction Company) Interurban Depot/Substation. The Depot was constructed in two phases between June 1910 and February 1921. The building was listed in the National Register of Historic Places in 2015 under Criterion A, with significant in the area of Transportation for its association with the development of interurban electric light rail transportation in Indiana during the early twentieth century and under Criterion C for its distinctive design and construction associated with the evolution of the interurban electrical light rail system.

An extensive exterior stabilization and restoration project was completed on the building in 2017, which reconstructed the building's roof, replaced doors and windows, and restored the brick masonry.

Notable people
 Walter Bullock, screenwriter and songwriter
 Hosea Siner, baseball player for the National League team Boston Doves in 1909
 Tony Bose, blade magazine cutlery hall of fame skilled craftsman. Known for teaching many of the worlds best knifemakers. Inspiring teacher of many Case knife patterns and custom knives.

References

Towns in Sullivan County, Indiana
Towns in Indiana
Terre Haute metropolitan area